Arthur Wilkinson (3 September 1919 – 1968) was a British orchestral composer and arranger.  He began composing while serving in the Royal Air Force during World War II, and made many contributions to film, stage shows and television.

Notable works
 The Three Rivers Fantasy, a pastiche of popular folk tunes of North-East England commissioned by Tyne Tees Television.  It ran every day at the opening of transmission until May 1983.
 Arrangements for the original London production of the musical Charlie Girl.
 The Beatlecracker Suite, an arrangement of songs by The Beatles into movements of Tchaikovsky's The Nutcracker Suite.

Selected filmography
 Trouble in the Air (1948)
 A Piece of Cake (1948) : music
 It's Not Cricket (1949) : music
 The Golden Year (1951) : special orchestrations
 Come Back Peter (1952)

External links
Tribute by composer Gavin Sutherland, includes link to MP3 of the "Three Rivers Fantasy".
 

1968 deaths
1919 births
20th-century classical musicians
20th-century British composers